Sven Mijnans (born 9 March 2000), is a Dutch professional footballer who plays as a midfielder for AZ Alkmaar.

Club career
Mijnans played in the academy of VV Spijkenisse. After experiences at Sparta Rotterdam and Feyenoord, he joined the academy of ADO Den Haag aged 16. However, he returned to VV Spijkenisse a year later. He made his Derde Divisie debut in February 2018.

Sparta Rotterdam
Mijnans joined Sparta Rotterdam in May 2018. At the start of the season, he had training sessions with the second team, but played most of his matches at under 19 level. He made his Tweede Divisie debut for the second team in November 2018. During the second half of the season, he was a regular starter for the second team. He was included in the match squad for the first team seven times at the end of his first season at Sparta Rotterdam as the club won promotion to the Eredivisie through the play-offs. Mijnans was included in the match squad for an Eredivisie game for a first time on 14 September 2019 against AZ.

First team
In September 2020, he extended his contract at Sparta Rotterdam until June 2022, with an option for another season. Five days later, he made his official debut for Sparta Rotterdam, replacing Adil Auassar for the final minutes of the match that resulted in a 2–0 defeat to Vitesse at the GelreDome. On 4 October 2020, Sparta Rotterdam was 4–0 down against AZ when Mijnans replaced Bryan Smeets at half time. At the end of the match, Mijnans scored his first professional goal to equalise. On 28 October 2020, Henk Fraser gave Mijnans his first professional start, in the KNVB Cup match against ADO Den Haag, which resulted in a defeat after a penalty shoot-out. Mijnans extended his contract at Sparta Rotterdam until the summer of 2024 in August 2021. On 18 December 2021, Mijnans scored both of Sparta Rotterdam's goals in a 2–2 draw against Vitesse. Sparta Rotterdam finished the Eredivisie season with a point ahead of the relegation zone.

AZ Alkmaar
On 31 January 2023, Mijnans signed a contract until 2028 for AZ Alkmaar, who reportedly paid a € 2.5 million transfer fee to Sparta Rotterdam.

International career
In October 2021, Mijnans was included in the provisional squad for the Netherlands under-21 team for a first time by Erwin van de Looi. In May 2022, he was included in the final squad of the under-21 team for a first time. He made his debut for the team on 7 June 2022, starting in the Euro qualifier against Gibraltar (6–0).

Career statistics

References

External links
 
 Career stats & Profile - Voetbal International
 Sven Mijnans OnsOranje

2000 births
Living people
Dutch footballers
Association football midfielders
Sparta Rotterdam players
AZ Alkmaar players
Eredivisie players